Pietroasa may refer to several places in Romania:

Populated places
 Pietroasa, Bihor, a commune in Bihor County
 Pietroasa, Timiș, a commune in Timiș County
 Pietroasa, a village in Valea Mare-Pravăț Commune, Argeș County
 Pietroasa, a village in Moldovenești Commune, Cluj County
 Pietroasa, a village in Valea Mare Commune, Vâlcea County
 Pietroasa, a village in Bolotești Commune, Vrancea County
 Pietroasa, a village in Câmpineanca Commune, Vrancea County
 Pietroasa, a village in Tâmboești Commune, Vrancea County
 Pietroasa, a village in Vârteșcoiu Commune, Vrancea County
 Pietroasa, a district in the town of Broșteni, Suceava County

Rivers
 Pietroasa, a tributary of the Apa Caldă in Cluj County
 Pietroasa, a tributary of the Bistra Mărului in Caraș-Severin County
 Pietroasa, a tributary of the Jiu in Gorj County
 Pietroasa, a tributary of the Jiul de Vest in Hunedoara County
 Pietroasa (Sărata), a tributary of the Sărata in Buzău County
 Pietroasa, a tributary of the Topa in Bihor County

See also 
 Piatra (disambiguation)
 Pietriș (disambiguation)
 Pietreni (disambiguation)
 Pietrari (disambiguation)
 Pietrosu (disambiguation)
 Pietrișu (disambiguation)
 Pietroșani (disambiguation)
 Pietricica (disambiguation)